This article lists all rugby league footballers who have played first-grade for the Wests Tigers. Players are listed according to the date of their debut game for the club. Players that debuted in the same game are normally capped in order of which position they played in the game, but order is at club discretion.

Statistics correct as of round 1 of the 2023 NRL season.

List of players

Notes

External links
First Grade Players - Weststigers.com.au
Rugby League Tables / Wests Tigers Point Scorers
RLP List of Players
RLP Wests Tigers Transfers & Debuts
Image of the Players' Register Plaque

 
Players
Lists of Australian rugby league players
National Rugby League lists
Sydney-sport-related lists